Hsu Chin-te (born 1 February 1966) is a Taiwanese former cyclist. He competed in the individual pursuit event at the 1984 Summer Olympics.

References

External links
 

1966 births
Living people
Taiwanese male cyclists
Olympic cyclists of Taiwan
Cyclists at the 1984 Summer Olympics
Place of birth missing (living people)